The Ivan Yarigin sports palace is located in Krasnoyarsk, Russia, on an island in the Yenisei River. It was commissioned on 5 November 1981 as the "Enisey sports palace" and was designed by Vitaly Orekhov. The shape of the building resembles an old carvel ship, with its obtuse front, curvy sides and round windows. The venue can accommodate 3300–5000 spectators depending on the event. It was named for the Soviet wrestler Ivan Yarygin in 1998, and currently is the home arena of the basketball club BC Yenisey Krasnoyarsk.

The palace hosted the Winter Spartakiad of Peoples of the USSR in 1982 and 1986. It supported national and international competitions in figure skating, wrestling, badminton, acrobatics, basketball, artistic gymnastics, boxing, ice hockey, karate and many other sports. The venue was reconstructed before the 1997 World Wrestling Championships, and ten years later hosted the Wrestling World Cup. It is open not only to competitions and shows, but also to daily training and rehabilitation activities. Two youth Olympic schools, for wrestling and weightlifting, are based there.

The facilities of the palace include
 all-purpose arena, 2275 sq meters
 choreography class, 203 sq meters
 all-purpose gym, 184 sq meters
 martial arts gym
 weightlifting gym
 wrestling gym

References

Basketball venues in Russia
Sports venues in Russia
Indoor arenas in Russia
Buildings and structures in Krasnoyarsk Krai